Robert Atherton (29 July 1876 – 19 October 1917)  was a Welsh footballer who played as a half back and forward for Heart of Midlothian, Hibernian, Middlesbrough and Chelsea in the late 1890s and early 1900s. He was capped by Wales at international level.

Early life
He was the son of Samuel Atherton and Ann Williams. His older brother was Tommy Atherton.

Career

Hibernian 
Although he was born in north Wales, Atherton grew up in Scotland. After spells with Dalry Primrose juniors and Heart of Midlothian, Atherton signed for Hibernian, at the start of the 1897–98 season. He was a versatile player who could play in a number of positions in midfield and the forward line.

He captained the Hibs side that won the 1902 Scottish Cup, a competition that Hibs did not win again until 2016. Hibs' 1–0 win against Celtic in the Cup Final was thanks in part to Atherton deceiving the Celtic defence by shouting for them to "leave the ball" in a Glaswegian accent. The Celtic defence duly complied, which allowed Andy McGeachen to score the only goal of the game. He then captained the Hibs side that won the 1903 league championship, the first in the club's history. He also played in all of Wales' matches in the 1903 British Home Championship.

Middlesbrough 

Atherton was transferred to Middlesbrough in 1903 and he became the first Middlesbrough player to win international honours.  Atherton made 66 appearances in all for Middlesbrough and became club captain.

International
He won his first cap for Wales while playing for Hibs in a 1899 British Home Championship match against Ireland, and he also played against England that year.

He scored his two international goals while with Middlesbrough. The first was in a 1–1 draw with Scotland at Dens Park, and the second was in a 2–2 draw against Ireland during his 9th and last international appearance.

Personal life
He married Margaret Jane Kirkconnell in Guisborough on 4 January 1904. They had four children.

Atherton retired from playing football after a short spell with Chelsea and he subsequently moved back to Edinburgh, becoming a steward in the Merchant Navy. He is commemorated on the Tower Hill Memorial.

Ancestry
He a direct descendant  of Gawain Atherton. His distant Atherton relatives include the American historian Lewis Eldon Atherton and politician, Gibson Atherton.

References 

Sources

1876 births
1917 deaths
Chelsea F.C. players
Heart of Midlothian F.C. players
Hibernian F.C. players
Middlesbrough F.C. players
Scottish Football League players
English Football League players
Wales international footballers
Welsh footballers
Civilians killed in World War I
British Merchant Service personnel of World War I
Association football wing halves
Association football forwards
Footballers from Edinburgh
Scottish Junior Football Association players